Cunningtonia longiventralis is a species of cichlid endemic to Lake Tanganyika in East Africa where it is found near rocky shores.  It eats floating plankton.  This species reaches a length of  TL.  It can also be found in the aquarium trade.   it is the only known member of its genus. The generic name honours the British zoologist and anthropologist William Alfred Cunnington (1877-1958), the leader of the expedition to Lake Tanganyika during which type was collected.

References

Ectodini
Monotypic fish genera
Taxa named by George Albert Boulenger
Taxonomy articles created by Polbot